Fish Creek is an unincorporated community located in Door County, Wisconsin, United States, within the town of Gibraltar and is located on Highway 42 along Green Bay.

History
Fish Creek sits on the site of a Menominee and Ojibwa village known as Ma-go-she-kah-ning, or "trout fishing". The first settler of Fish Creek was Increase Claflin and his family circa 1844, but the village founder is considered to be entrepreneur Asa Thorp. Loggers and fishermen started settling in Fish Creek in 1853. Thorp owned much of the area's land by that year, and built Fish Creek's first dock in 1855. The first post office began in 1866 in the kitchen of John Brown's home. Fish Creek's oldest unchanged residence, the Alexander Noble House, was built in 1875 and today is on the National Register of Historic Places. By 1900, summer tourists were frequently visiting the village, and Fish Creek became a resort community.

Fish Creek is also adjacent to Peninsula State Park, and its main entrance is in the village. The park has a cream city brick lighthouse built in 1866. Eagle Bluff Lighthouse is fully restored, furnished with fine antiques, as it looked in the 19th Century, and is open daily for tours in the summer months. The great advantage of the almost  park is that it is the main view from Fish Creek Harbor. The fact that it will never be developed is a great asset to the community. The view of Weborg Point is spectacular, with the huge Gibraltar Bluff looming behind the village. The Department of Natural Resources has also worked to encourage a return of eagles, which were once almost extinct; Eagle Bluff is now the home to a number of nesting pairs.

With a fairly large art community, Fish Creek has always attracted artists and craftspeople. It is home to one of the last remaining clockmakers in the State of Wisconsin. Many studios sell artwork and are open to the public. The village is also home to the Peninsula School of Art, founded by Madeline Tourtelot in 1965. Classes in most of the arts are available in the summer months. Not far from the Art School, the Door County Auditorium hosts performing artists from all over the country. It is accessible to the local high school so that students may take advantage of the stage for their own productions.

Historical landmarks
Freeman and Jesse Thorp House and Cottages
Vorous General Store

Climate

Education
Gibraltar Area Schools serves the community. Gibraltar Elementary School and Gibraltar Secondary School are the two schools.

Gallery

References

External links

Fish Creek Civic Association
 Fish Creek & Ephraim tour video, Around the Corner with John McGivern, Episode #612, PBS (Archived April 19, 2020)

Unincorporated communities in Wisconsin
Unincorporated communities in Door County, Wisconsin